Hicham Aboucherouane (born 2 April 1981) is a Moroccan former professional footballer who played as a winger.

He began his career 1997 with Najm El Aounat, 1999 was transferred to Raja Casablanca. He was loaned out from Raja Casablanca in July 2005 to June 2006 by OSC Lille. In January 2007 he moved from Raja Casablanca to Espérance de Tunis and he transferred in July 2008 to Al-Ittihad.

References

1981 births
Living people
People from El Jadida
Moroccan footballers
Association football forwards
Morocco international footballers
2006 Africa Cup of Nations players
2008 Africa Cup of Nations players
Ligue 1 players
Qatar Stars League players
Saudi Professional League players
Al Ahli SC (Doha) players
Al Nassr FC players
Raja CA players
Lille OSC players
Espérance Sportive de Tunis players
Ittihad FC players
Botola players
Moroccan expatriate footballers
Moroccan expatriate sportspeople in France
Expatriate footballers in France
Moroccan expatriate sportspeople in Tunisia
Expatriate footballers in Tunisia
Moroccan expatriate sportspeople in Saudi Arabia
Expatriate footballers in Saudi Arabia
Moroccan expatriate sportspeople in Qatar
Expatriate footballers in Qatar
Association football coaches